Grytøy Lighthouse is a coastal lighthouse in Bodø Municipality in Nordland county, Norway.

It has two flashes every 10 seconds, the color that flashes is white or red depending on direction from which it is seen.

History
The original lighthouse was built in 1865.  It was a square light tower attached to the front of a two-story keeper's house.  It was located near the current lighthouse.  That lighthouse was closed and demolished in 1959 and replaced with an automated light tower nearby.

See also

Lighthouses in Norway
List of lighthouses in Norway

References

External links
 Norsk Fyrhistorisk Forening 

Lighthouses completed in 1865
Lighthouses in Nordland
Buildings and structures in Bodø
1865 establishments in Norway